Nikita Yevheniyovych Havrylenko (born 13 June 1988) is a Ukrainian football player.

Career
Nikita Havrylenko was born in Chernihiv and he started his career at the Arsenal-2 Kyiv, in 2004 until 2006 playing 45 matches. Since 2008, he played in amateur clubs "Svitanok" (Kovalivka), "Irpin" (Gorenichi), "Zenit" (Boyarka) and Dinaz Vyshhorod. In late 2011, he became a player of Desna Chernihiv, the main club in the city of Chernihiv, his native place. On 23 July 2011 he made his debut in the football of the Chernihiv club in the missed (0: 2) visibility match of the 1st round of Group A of the Other League against Sumy. Mikita viyshov on the field in the starting warehouse, and on the 46th minute, where replaced Andriy Gerasimenko. At the Desna Chernihiv he played ten matches at the Ukrainian Second League and one match at the Ukrainian Cup. During the winter break the season of 2011/12 years of travel in Moldova, having become a PLAYER of Iskra-Stal. In 2013, he turned to Ukraine, having played for "ARP-410" in the Kiev championship. An offensive engraving for "The Seagull" (Petropavlovskaya Borshagivka) in the amateur championship of Ukraine. In 2015 he played for Lyubomyr Stavyshche in the championship of the Kiev region.

Honours
SC Chaika
 Ukrainian Amateur Cup: 2013
 Kyiv Oblast Cup: 2013

Desna Chernihiv
 Ukrainian Second League: Runner-Up 2011–12

Dinaz Vyshhorod
 Football championship of Kyiv Oblast: 2011

References

External links 
 Nikita Havrylenko footballfacts.ru
 Nikita Havrylenko allplayers.in.ua
 
 

1988 births
Living people
Footballers from Chernihiv
FC Desna Chernihiv players
FC Dinaz Vyshhorod players
FC Iskra-Stal players
SC Chaika Petropavlivska Borshchahivka players
FC Lyubomyr Stavyshche players
Ukrainian footballers
Ukrainian Premier League players
Ukrainian First League players
Ukrainian Second League players
Latvian Higher League players
Ukrainian expatriate sportspeople in Moldova
Expatriate footballers in Moldova
Association football midfielders